HMCS James Bay (hull number MCB 152) was a  that was constructed for the Royal Canadian Navy during the Cold War. Entering service in 1954, the ship served on the West Coast of Canada until 1964 when James Bay was decommissioned. The minesweeper was sold in 1966 for use as an offshore oil exploration vessel.

Design and description
The Bay class were designed and ordered as replacements for the Second World War-era minesweepers that the Royal Canadian Navy operated at the time.

They had a complement of 38 officers and ratings.

The Bay-class minesweepers were powered by two GM 12-cylinder diesel engines driving two shafts creating . The ships were armed with one 40 mm Bofors gun and were equipped with minesweeping gear.

Operational history
The ship's keel was laid down on 16 August 1951 by Yarrows Ltd. in  Esquimalt, British Columbia. Initially named Chantry, the vessel was renamed for a bay located between Ontario and Quebec with islands that are part of Nunavut within. James Bay was launched on 12 March 1953. The ship was commissioned on 3 May 1954.

Serving on the West Coast of Canada, in November 1955, the Second Canadian Minesweeping Squadron was among the Canadian units that took part a large naval exercise off the coast of California. The Second Minesweeping Squadron, of which James Bay was a member made a port visit at Stockton, California in June 1960. The vessel was paid off on 28 February 1964. James Bay was sold to commercial interests in 1966 for use in offshore oil exploration.

References

Notes

Citations

References
 
 
 
 
 

 

Bay-class minesweepers
Ships built in British Columbia
1953 ships
Cold War minesweepers of Canada
Minesweepers of the Royal Canadian Navy